All of the amphibians of New Zealand are either from the endemic genus Leiopelma or are one of the introduced species, of which three are extant. Pepeketua is the  Māori word.

Unique characteristics

Members of the genus Leiopelma exhibit a number of basal traits that separate them from most other species. These traits include: vestigial tail-wagging muscles, cartilaginous inscriptional ribs, the presence of amphicoelous vertebrae, and nine presachral vertebrae (most frogs have eight). In addition, Leiopelma lack external ear drums and produce only limited vocalizations.

Species

Native

Introduced

See also

Environment of New Zealand
Conservation in New Zealand
Fauna of New Zealand

References

Further reading

External links
New Zealand Frog Conservation Biology - research on New Zealand frog biology
New Zealand Frog Research Group - information and resources on frog conservation from the University of Otago
 EcoGecko - New Zealand herpetology consultant/research
Frogs at the Department of Conservation

 
New Zealand
New Zealand
amphibians